Kalle Samooja (born 25 January 1988) is a Finnish professional golfer.

Early life
Samooja was born in Turku, Finland. He started playing golf when he was eight years old after being introduced to the game by his father.

Professional career
Samooja competed in the European Tour Qualifying School in 2008, 2009, 2010, 2013, and 2014. He did not make it onto the European Tour during any of these experiences. During this interim period he primarily played on the Asian Tour. He did not have a ton of success but recorded top-10 finishes at the 2012 Handa Faldo Cambodian Classic and 2015 Philippine Open.

In 2016, Samooja made it on to the European Tour's developmental tour, the Challenge Tour. Samooja finished 69th and 71st on the Challenge Tour's Order of Merit in 2016 and 2017. In 2018, he won the Hainan Open and finished 4th on the Order of Merit earning a promotion to the European Tour.

In 2019, his rookie season on the European Tour, Samooja recorded four top-25 finishes through the first half of the year including a top-10 at the Kenya Open. Samooja would then play excellently at the Omega European Masters that summer. Samooja fired a third round 62 (−8) to get near the lead. During the final round he fired a 67 to tie several players at the end of regulation. The five-way playoff included: Rory McIlroy, Sebastian Söderberg,  Samooja, Lorenzo Gagli, and Andrés Romero. Samooja had the closest approach to the hole, to five feet. Soderberg made an eight-foot birdie putt and the other competitors missed. Samooja, putting last, would "miss narrowly" assuring Soderberg's victory.

Samooja would have one more top-10 during the season, a T-10 at the Nedbank Golf Challenge. These three top-10s helped him finish 62nd on the Order of Merit and thereby keep his card.

In June 2022, Samooja won the Porsche European Open shooting a final-round 64 (−8) to claim his first European Tour victory.

Professional wins (12)

European Tour wins (1)

European Tour playoff record (0–2)

Challenge Tour wins (1)

1Co-sanctioned by the China Tour

Nordic Golf League wins (2)

Finnish Tour wins (8)

Results in major championships

CUT = missed the half-way cut

Team appearances
Amateur
European Boys' Team Championship (representing Finland): 2005, 2006
European Amateur Team Championship (representing Finland): 2008, 2009, 2010
Eisenhower Trophy (representing Finland): 2010
St Andrews Trophy (representing Continent of Europe): 2010 (winners)

See also
2018 Challenge Tour graduates

References

External links

Finnish male golfers
European Tour golfers
Asian Tour golfers
Olympic golfers of Finland
Golfers at the 2020 Summer Olympics
Sportspeople from Turku
1988 births
Living people
21st-century Finnish people